Paul Mauffray is an American conductor and laureat of the 2007 Bartók International Opera Conducting Competition, The American Prize for Conductors, and 1996 Freedman Conducting Competition. He has studied at the New Orleans Center for Creative Arts, Louisiana State University, Justus Liebig University (Giessen), Masaryk University (Brno), and earned a Masters of Music degree in Orchestra Conducting as an Associate Instructor / Assistant Conductor at Indiana University's Jacobs School of Music.

He has been engaged in the Czech Republic at the Prague National Theater and National Theater in Brno, and he has worked as assistant conductor to Sir Charles Mackerras with the Czech Philharmonic on recordings of Leoš Janáček's Kata Kabanova and Antonín Dvořák's Rusalka.  He has also worked as assistant conductor on operas at the Salzburg Festival, Theater an der Wien, and was a guest conductor at the Romanian National Opera, Bucharest, Schleswig-Holsteinisches Landestheater, Slovak National Theater (Bratislava, Slovakia), Opéra Louisiane, Mobile Opera Alabama, and the Mariinsky Theatre in Saint Petersburg, Russia.

As an advocate for the revival of lost operas, Paul Mauffray recorded excerpts from the 1964 opera "The Scarlet Letter" by Fredric Kroll with the Brno Philharmonic, and he reconstructed George Whitefield Chadwick's "Burlesque Opera of Tabasco" which had been lost since 1894 and which he conducted with New Orleans Opera in 2018.

In 2018, Paul Mauffray was inducted as a national honorary member of Phi Mu Alpha Sinfonia music fraternity and recognized as a Signature Sinfonian.

Orchestras 
The orchestras which Paul Mauffray has conducted include the following:

Awards
 Second Place 2021, 2018, Third Place 2015, 2016, & 2019 Honorary Mention 2014 , The American Prize for Professional Conductors
 Second Prize, Béla Bartók International Opera Conducting Competition, Romania, 2007 
 First Prize, Freedman Conducting Competition, U.S.A., 1996
 Honorary Mention & Semi-Finalist, Prague Spring International Conducting Competition, Czech Republic, 1995 & 2000

External links
 Official website
 Conducting videos
 Excerpts from "The Scarlet Letter" by Fredric Kroll
 Janáček Lachian Dances with folk ballet at Janáček Festival Hukvaldy 2014

References

American male conductors (music)
Living people
Louisiana State University alumni
Indiana University faculty
Jacobs School of Music faculty
Masaryk University alumni
21st-century American conductors (music)
21st-century American male musicians
Year of birth missing (living people)